Union Township is one of the seventeen townships of Logan County, Ohio, United States. As of the 2010 census, the population was 819.

Geography
Located in the southwestern part of the county, it borders the following townships:
Harrison Township - north
Liberty Township - east
Harrison Township, Champaign County - south
Miami Township - southwest
Pleasant Township - northwest

No municipalities are located in Union Township.

Name and history
Union Township was formed in 1820. It is one of twenty-seven Union Townships statewide.

Government
The township is governed by a three-member board of trustees, who are elected in November of odd-numbered years to a four-year term beginning on the following January 1. Two are elected in the year after the presidential election and one is elected in the year before it. There is also an elected township fiscal officer, who serves a four-year term beginning on April 1 of the year after the election, which is held in November of the year before the presidential election. Vacancies in the fiscal officership or on the board of trustees are filled by the remaining trustees.

In the elections of November 2007, Steve Yoder and Sonya King were elected without opposition to the positions of township trustee and township fiscal officer respectively.

Transportation
State Route 508 passes through Union Township.

References

External links
County website
County and township map of Ohio
Detailed Logan County map

Townships in Logan County, Ohio
Townships in Ohio
1820 establishments in Ohio
Populated places established in 1820